Two ships of Bangladesh Navy carried the name BNS Ali Haider:
 , a  transferred from Royal Navy.
 , a Type 053H2 (Jianghu-III) frigate transferred from People's Liberation Army Navy.

Bangladesh Navy ship names